Mitchell Peak may refer to:

 Mitchell Peak (Antarctica), a mountain in Antarctica.
 Mitchell Peak (Wyoming), a mountain in the Wind River Range, Wyoming, USA

See also
Mount Mitchell (disambiguation)